Abdirizak Sheikuna Mohamed (born October 25, 1996) is a Somali footballer who plays for MLS Next Pro team Columbus Crew 2 and the Somalia national team.

International career
Mohamed was born in Kenya to Somali parents, and was raised in the United States. In September 2019, Mohamed was called into the Somalia national football team for its 2022 World Cup qualifiers against Zimbabwe. On 5 September, he made his international debut for Somalia in their 1–0 win over Zimbabwe.

Career statistics

Club

Notes

International

References

External links
 
 Abdi Mohamed at Ohio State University
 Abdi Mohamed at the University of Akron

1996 births
Living people
Sportspeople from Nairobi
Association football defenders
People with acquired Somali citizenship
Somalian footballers
Somalia international footballers
Somalian emigrants to the United States
Naturalized citizens of the United States
American soccer players
Kenyan footballers
Kenyan people of Somali descent
Soccer players from Ohio
People from Westerville, Ohio
African-American soccer players
Ohio State Buckeyes men's soccer players
Akron Zips men's soccer players
New York City FC draft picks
New York City FC players
USL Championship players
Memphis 901 FC players
21st-century African-American sportspeople
Columbus Crew 2 players
MLS Next Pro players